Ramp is an album by the American alternative rock band Giant Sand, released in 1991. The album was released via frontman Howe Gelb's Amazing Black Sand label, before being picked up by Restless Records.

Production
The majority of the album was produced by Gelb. Victoria Williams contributed backing vocals to the album's second track, "Romance of Falling," the only track produced by Dusty Wakeman. Pappy Allen also makes an appearance on Ramp. The album was recorded in Los Angeles and Tucson.

Critical reception

Robert Christgau wrote: "The first side makes something of the dissociated atmospherics that undermined the band's previous umpteen releases; the second's almost popwise. Together they're what country-rock was never really like, or wanted to be." Trouser Press thought that "Gelb seems to have found a way to propel himself at will into a deconstruction zone where boogie can mutate into pre-rock vocal harmony ('Warm Storm') and Sun Ra can be construed as a lounge lizard (the slurry 'Jazzer Snipe')." The Austin American-Statesman deemed it "the kind of revelatory release that makes one want to search out everything the band has previously recorded."

The Spin Alternative Record Guide opined that the band "has mastered the art of rambling within a loose structure."

Track listing

Personnel
Joey Burns - bass
John Convertino - drums
Howe Gelb - guitar, vocals

References

Giant Sand albums
1991 albums